The 1963 Sugar Bowl featured the 3rd ranked Ole Miss Rebels, and the 6th ranked Arkansas Razorbacks.

Game summary
Ole Miss took the early 3–0 lead in the second quarter, after a 30-yard Irwin field goal. Arkansas answered with a 30-yard field goal from Tom McKnelly, tying the game at 3-3. Quarterback Glynn Griffing threw a 33-yard touchdown pass to Louis Guy, giving Ole Miss a 10–3 lead at halftime.

In the third quarter, Razorback quarterback Billy Moore, who was eventually knocked out of the game by Ole Miss' Buck Randall,  found Jesse Branch for a 5-yard touchdown pass that tied the game at 10. Glynn Griffin scored on a 1-yard touchdown run giving Ole Miss a 17–10 lead. A 22-yard Tom McKnelly field goal in the fourth quarter, pulled the Razorbacks to 17–13, but Ole Miss held on for the win. Glynn Griffin was named Sugar Bowl MVP.

See also
 Arkansas–Ole Miss football rivalry

References

Sugar Bowl
Sugar Bowl
Arkansas Razorbacks football bowl games
Ole Miss Rebels football bowl games
Sugar Bowl
Sugar Bowl